The Permanent Judges of the Court of Final Appeal are full-time judges sitting on Hong Kong's final appellate court, the Court of Final Appeal. They are called Permanent Judges because they are required to sit on every appeal committee and court case relating to the Court of Final Appeal, and to distinguish them from other part-time jurists who also sit on the top court, known as Non-Permanent Judges.

History 
At the founding of the court on 1 July 1997, as the Permanent Judges were all sworn in on the same day, they were sorted by seniority (whichever year they took Silk). The Chief Justice sat in the middle; Henry Litton, being the most senior judge and would sit on the Chief Justice's right, with Charles Ching being the second most senior judge (sitting on the Chief Justice's left) and Kemal Bokhary being the least senior Permanent Judge, sitting on the right of Henry Litton.

Eligibility 
According to the Hong Kong Court of Final Appeal Ordinance, Permanent Judges are recommended by the Judicial Officers Recommendation Commission, and officially appointed by the Chief Executive. People may be eligible to become a Permanent Judge by being the Chief Judge of the High Court, a High Court judge, or practiced as a barrister or solicitor in Hong Kong for over 10 years.

In practice, every Permanent Judge appointed has been at least a Justice of Appeal of the Court of Appeal or above (Vice-President, Chief Judge, or Non-Permanent Judge); no practicing barrister has ever been appointed directly as a Permanent Judge without full time judicial experience.

Length of Service 
Permanent Judges are required to retire by age 70, but this can be extended by up to two three-year terms, so final retirement age may be 76. This came into effect in late 2019, whereas previously the retirement age was 65 (from 1997 to late 2019), also with two three-year extensions possible for a final retirement age of 71.

List of Permanent Judges 
There are to be at least three Permanent Judges on the top court at any given time, with the current Judges in bold in the list below.

Education

By graduate degree(s) 
Note: Judges may have more than one graduate degree, and hence may be counted twice on this list

 University of Hong Kong (3) – Chan, Cheung, Lam
 Harvard University (1) – Cheung
 London School of Economics (1) – Ribeiro

By undergraduate degree 

 University of Hong Kong (3) – Chan, Cheung, Lam
 University of Oxford (2) – Litton, Ching
 London School of Economics (1) – Ribeiro
 University of Birmingham (1) – Tang
 University College London (1) – Fok

Length of tenure

See also 

 Court of Final Appeal (Hong Kong)
 Chief Justice of the Court of Final Appeal

References 

Judiciary of Hong Kong
Court of Final Appeal (Hong Kong)